30th Street station is an underground SEPTA rapid transit and trolley station in Philadelphia. It is located on Market Street between 30th and 31st Streets in the University City neighborhood, adjacent to 30th Street Station and Drexel University. The station features four tracks – the inner pair serving the Market–Frankford Line and the outer pair for subway–surface trolleys.

History 

The PRT announced a project to bury the elevated tracks between 23rd to 46th streets in the 1920s. The tunnel from 23rd to 32nd streets was completed by 1933, but construction on the remaining segment was put on hiatus due to the Great Depression and World War II. The PRT went bankrupt in 1939 and was reorganized as the PTC, which began building the rest of the tunnel in 1947.

The underground station is half a block southwest of 30th Street Station, the city's main intercity rail and commuter rail station. A tunnel previously connected the two stations, but was closed in the 1980s, reportedly due to safety concerns. Amtrak and SEPTA considered reopening the tunnel in the early 2000s, but the September 11 attacks ended those plans.

In December 2018, SEPTA received a $15 million grant from the United States Department of Transportation to make significant improvements to the station. The improvement project was projected to cost over $37 million, with remaining funds contributed by SEPTA's capital budget and the developer Brandywine Realty Trust, which owns 3000-3020 Market Street directly above the subway station and is planning the Schuylkill Yards megaproject.  The project calls for improvements to the station's mezzanine, as well as reopening and renovating the underground concourse connecting the subway station with the main 30th Street Station building. A second access point to the station at the corner of 31st and Market streets reopened in late 2019, which includes a staircase and new elevator. The full project was expected to be completed in 2021, but as of January 2023, is ongoing.

The 30th Street Station District, a proposed development plan, calls for the station house at the northwest corner of 30th and Market streets to be rebuilt.

Station layout 
The station has a high-level island platform for Market–Frankford trains and two low-level side platforms for subway–surface trolleys.

Bus connections 
In addition to rail services at 30th Street Station, the station is also served by numerous bus routes, including routes 9, 30, 31, 44, 49, 62, and LUCY operated by the SEPTA City Transit Division, as well as routes 124 and 125 operated by the SEPTA Suburban Division.

Image gallery

References

External links 

Images at SubwayNut 
Images at NYCSubway.org
30th Street entrance from Google Maps Street View
31st Street entrance from Google Maps Street View

SEPTA Market-Frankford Line stations
SEPTA Subway–Surface Trolley Line stations
30th Street MFL SSTL
Railway stations in the United States opened in 1956
University City, Philadelphia
Railway stations located underground in Pennsylvania
1956 establishments in Pennsylvania